Hotchkiss is an unincorporated community in Raleigh County, West Virginia, United States, along the Slab Fork and West Virginia Route 54.

References

Unincorporated communities in West Virginia
Unincorporated communities in Raleigh County, West Virginia
Coal towns in West Virginia